Kilis 7 Aralık University is located in the city of Kilis, in southeastern Turkey. The name of the university comes from the date when the city of Kilis was liberated from occupation during the Turkish War of Independence – December 7, 1921.

History 

Kilis 7 Aralık University was founded on May 29, 2007, by the Turkish government. The Yusuf Şerefoğlu School of Health was founded in 1997, and Kilisli Muallim Rıfat Education Faculty was founded in 1998. They were followed by Faculty of Arts and Sciences in 2003; the Faculty of Economics and Administrative Sciences, Vocational School of Health, and Graduate Schools of Science and Social Sciences in 2007; the Faculty of Engineering and Architecture in 2010; and the College of Physical Education and Sports (BESYO) and Faculty of Theology in 2012.

The University serves more than 8,000 undergraduate and graduate students from around the world in six faculties, two vocational schools, and three institutes, with 250 teaching staff in Karatas and on the main campus.

Kilis 7 Aralık University has had the Erasmus University Charter since 2009. Accordingly, the ECTS is recognized for all faculties. The university's strategy focuses on extending and improving cooperation with foreign partners.  The introduction of ECTS in undergraduate programs has facilitated accreditation. The university actively encourages its students to participate in EU student exchange programs.

Because Kilis 7 Aralık University participates in the Bologna process, the students earn a diploma and diploma supplement (DS) that are valid throughout the world.

Basic facts 

The university has many aspects in common with other large universities, including a university campus with an additional city location, broad course options, student mobility programs (Erasmus+, Mevlana (RUMI), and Farabi), dormitories, and social life and sports facilities.

Education research and practice centers 

The university's research centers include its Continuing Education Center (KÜSEM), Distance Education Center (KUZEM), Agricultural Research and Application Center (TUAM), Language Teaching Application and Research Center (DÖMER), Research Center for Middle Eastern Studies, and Application and Research Center for Computer Science.

Social facilities 

Social and sports facilities include basketball and tennis courts, football fields, an outdoor sports park, a fitness saloon, a swimming pool, an indoor sports facility, a theatre hall, the Kilis House, a music room, an Ebru (Turkish water painting, also known as paper marbling) art room, and an exhibition hall.

Student clubs 

Student clubs include:

 Community Volunteers Club
 Culture, Arts and Literature Club
 Travel and Organizing Club
 Youth and the Red Crescent Club
 Photography Club
 Student Assistance and Solidarity Club
 Career Club
 Attraction Club
 Turkish Culture Club
 Health Club
 Fit Youth Club
 Textile Club
 Scientific and Technical Club
 Aviation Club
 Music Club

Programs and departments

Kilisli Muallim Rıfat Faculty of Education 

 Science Education
 Pre-School (Earlychildhood) Education
 Elementary (Primary) Education
 Social Studies Education
 Turkish Language Education
 Special Education
 Elementary Education Mathematics Teaching

Faculty of Arts and Sciences 

 Arabic Language and Literature
 Geography
 Philosophy
 Molecular Biology and Genetics
 History
 Turkish Language and Literature

Faculty of Economics and Administrative Sciences 
 Economics  
 Business Administration
 Political Science and Public Administration
 International Trade and Logistics

Faculty of Engineering and Architecture 
 Civil Engineering 
 Food Engineering
 Electrical and Electronics Engineering

Faculty of Theology 
 Theology

Faculty of Agriculture 
 Horticulture

Yusuf Şerefoğlu School of Health 
 Nursing

College of Physical Education and Sports (BESYO)

Vocational School of Health 
 Paramedics
 Medical Documentation and Secretary
 Care of the Elderly
 Opticianry
 Child Development/Care
 Physiotherapy

Kilis Vocational School 
 Gardening
 Cookery
 Computer Programming  
 Foreign Trade  
 Electricity  
 Gas and Installation Technology  
 Construction Technology  
 Business Management  
 Occupational Health and Safety  
 Machine Design  
 Accounting and Taxation Applications  
 Landscape and Ornamental Plants  
 Textile Technology  
 Medicinal and Aromatic Plants  
 Tourism and Hotel Management  
 Construction Inspector Training

Institute of Science (Graduate School of Science) 
 Biology
 Physics
 Civil Engineering
 Chemistry
 Mathematics
 Electrical and Electronics Engineering
 Science Education

Institute of Social Sciences (Graduate School of Social Sciences)

Masters Program
 Elementary School Religious Culture and Moral Knowledge Education
 Business Administration (MBA)
 History
 Economics
 Business Administration

Doctoral Program
 Business Administration

Institute of Health Sciences (Graduate School of Health Sciences)

Courses in English and Turkish 
Courses are available in English and Turkish.

Grading system

Degrees 
Students who complete 120 ECTS credits and have a minimum 2.00 out of 4.00 grade point average (GPA) will earn an associate degree.

Students who complete 240 ECTS credits and have a minimum 2.00 out of 4.00 grade point average (GPA) will earn a bachelor's degree (B.A.).

The Ph.D. degree is awarded to students who have successfully completed all required courses with a GPA of at least 3.00 out of 4.00, and have prepared and defended a thesis.

Grading scale 
The European Credit Transfer and Accumulation System (ECTS System) is used.

Students who receive any grade of CC or higher (CC, CB, BB, BA, or AA) for a course are considered to have satisfactorily completed the course. Students who receive a grade of either DC or DD in one or more courses can be considered successful only it their cumulative grade point average (CGPA) is 2.00 or higher at the end of the semester. Student who receive grades of FD or FF are considered unsuccessful. N/A means that the student never attended to courses and failed. Non-credit courses are evaluated as S (satisfactory) or U (Unsatisfactory). The grades S and U are not considered while calculating CGPA.

ECTS, the European Credit Transfer System, was created by the European Commission in order to offer standard procedures for academic recognition of studies abroad. A student can earn 30 ECTS credits for a semester and 60 ECTS credits for an entire academic year.

Teaching and learning methods 
The teaching methods used at Kilis 7 Aralık University vary with class size. The early years can be characterized by large groups. Almost all the modules require smaller interactive groups. For Erasmus+ students, if there are not enough students registered for the courses, individual study is often used.

Library 

The main library includes reading rooms and an Internet access center equipped with scanners, copy machines, and printers. The library offers:
 	
 40,000 books in an open shelf system and various periodicals
 Databases for research
 A book reading system for visually impaired people
 YORDAM Automation System for resource scan and access 
 The KITS inter-library book loan system 
 A lounge with daily newspapers

University Library opening hours are 8:00 am to 20:00 pm.

Information technologies 

The Communication and information Technologies Department provides computer facilities and information technologies for all staff and students. Each department has its own computer lab for students and all classrooms have wireless Internet access, a computer, and a projector.

Health care 

The Center for Medico-Social Unit is on the ground floor of Sosyal-Kültürel Merkez building on the main campus. In the unit, basic health services are provided for students, such as glucose and blood pressure measurement. It also provides first aid services for all students at the university.

Accommodation 
A 100-student dormitory for international students is available in Karatas campus.

There are also private student dorms around the campus that provide affordable accommodation to students.

Disability support 
This unit at the campus supports handicapped students to minimize challenges encountered during their education and campus life and improve the environment around them. The lifts, ramps, toilets, sidewalks, and roads at the campus are accessible for disabled students. The book-reading system for visually impaired students is available at the main library.  The ring service is available for students who are physically disabled.

Food and drink 

Student Dining Hall: There is an on-campus dining hall with a capacity of 1,000 students. Lunch and dinner, including traditional Turkish food, are served daily.
Kilis House Social Facility: Breakfast and lunch are served in a renovated authentic Kilis House.
Cafeterias: Student cafeterias serve hot and cold drinks. They also offer various food options in every faculty.

Transportation 

There are intercity coaches in Kilis and Gaziantep to travel to any city in Turkey. Kilis bus station is in the city center and easily accessible to the students.
 
When traveling by coach/bus, the Özgür Dolmuş (Midi Bus) at Gaziantep Otogar (Central Station for coaches) is taken to go to Kilis. It costs 7 TL (€2).

The distance from Kilis 7 Aralık University to the nearest airport (Gaziantep) is 40 km.

Local public transportation consists of midi buses (Dolmus) operating from 6:00 am to 23:00 pm. The price of a ticket is 1.25 TL for students (€0.40).

Affiliations 
The university is a member of the Caucasus University Association.

References

 http://disiliskiler.kilis.edu.tr/EN
 http://www.studyinturkey.gov.tr/profiles/info/307
 http://www.kilis.edu.tr/english/
 http://www.yok.gov.tr
 https://www.4icu.org/reviews/13723.htm
 http://www.kilis.edu.tr/katalog/2012_katalog.pdf
 Trip Advisor
 Population of Kilis
 All About Kilis
 Statistics about Kilis
 Southeastern Anatolia Project

External links
 
 Why Kilis 7 Aralık University?
 Kilis 7 Aralık University
 Education in Turkey
 Study in Turkey
 A Guide for the City of Kilis

Youtube videos

2007 establishments in Turkey
Educational institutions established in 2007
Kilis
State universities and colleges in Turkey
Universities and colleges in Turkey